Toplofikatsiya Ruse is the district heating company in the city of Ruse in Northern Bulgaria. As of 2011, the company is owned by Russian company Mechel.

Toplofikatsiya Ruse has two power stations producing electricity and heat. The heat distribution network in Ruse has a total length of 79 km as of 2011, and serves over 18,000 customers.

The first power station in Ruse, TEC Ruse, was a diesel power plant with an installed capacity of 6.4 MWe. It was built in 1917 with a capacity of 1.4 MWe, with a further 5 MWe added in 1949. It was brought out of exploitation in 1964.

See also

 Energy in Bulgaria

References

External links 
 toplo-ruse.com – Official website (in English)

Coal-fired power stations in Bulgaria
Electric power companies of Bulgaria
Ruse, Bulgaria